The 1974 Houston Oilers season was the 15th season overall and fifth with the National Football League. The team improved upon their previous season's 1–13 record, winning seven games. Despite the improvement, they failed to qualify for the playoffs for the fifth consecutive season.

Offseason

NFL draft

Roster

Schedule

Preseason
Due to a player's strike affecting the 1974 preseason, the Oilers, like the rest of the NFL, played the preseason using an all-rookie roster. The strike was resolved prior to the start of the regular season.

On July 16, the Oilers played a preseason game vs the minor league San Antonio Toros, marking the last time an NFL team would play a game against a minor league team. (In 1969, the Atlanta Falcons rookies would play the minor league Alabama Hawks and in 1972 the New York Jets rookies would play the minor league Long Island Chiefs)

Regular season

Standings

Season summary

Week 1 vs Chargers

References

Houston Oilers seasons
Houston Oilers
Houston